TestPAC (formerly known as "TestPAC, Please Ignore") is a crowdfunded, non-connected political action committee in the United States. Its Chairman is Jeromie Whalen. It is best known for its 2012 campaign to defeat incumbent U.S. Representative Lamar Smith (R-TX) in response to the Congressman's introduction of the Stop Online Piracy Act and H.R.1981

History
TestPAC was registered with the Federal Election Commission on January 31, 2012. TestPAC started when several members of the Reddit community initiated a netroots boycott of GoDaddy.com and "Operation Pull Ryan", where Reddit members helped Paul Ryan's opponent, Rob Zerban raise $15,000 in 48 hours. When Ryan eventually came out in opposition of SOPA, activists Andy Posterick and Jeromie Whalen formed a political action committee for potential future campaigns.

TestPAC was originally registered as "TestPAC, Please Ignore." The name is a play on an inside joke on Reddit; the site's most popular post ever was titled "Test Post, Please Ignore."

Overview
TestPAC crowdsources its mission, goals and campaigns from its member-base on the PAC's discussion forum on Reddit. Although most decisions are made among PAC members, major decisions are put to an official vote on the PAC's website. So far, the organization has held two official votes: one asking members whether to campaign against Lamar Smith and one to decide on a concept for a billboard advertisement.

TestPAC primarily relies on crowdfunding as a means of fundraising and solicits donations on social media websites such as Facebook, Twitter, and Reddit.

Current campaigns

In February 2012, TestPAC members voted between removing 13-term incumbent Lamar Smith from office or Campaign Finance Reform for the PAC's first target issue. With 63% of the vote, members elected to start a campaign against Lamar Smith. The campaign was officially titled "Mr. Smith Comes Back From Washington".

TestPAC had chosen this campaign primarily because of Rep. Smith's support of the controversial Stop Online Piracy Act and introduction of H.R. 1981. The primary strategy for accomplishing this is encouraging registered Republicans and Democrats to vote in the May 29th semi-open Republican Primary against Smith.

On April 4, 2012, TestPAC released its first television commercial

Leadership

Test PAC's leadership structure is volunteer-based and open to anyone. The PAC lists several officers on its website who organize operational elements of the PAC's campaigns and manage day-to-day operations of the organization. According to the Federal Election Commission, Andrew J Posterick is registered as the PAC Treasurer.

References

External links 
 TestPAC official website
 TestPAC Twitter official Twitter
 Sub-Reddit TestPAC official sub-Reddit

Political advocacy groups in the United States
527 organizations
Internet privacy organizations
Internet-related activism
Political organizations based in the United States
Organizations established in 2012
Politics and technology
2012 establishments in the United States